, also known as , is a trans-Neptunian object from the scattered disc of the outermost reaches of the Solar System, approximately 78 kilometers in diameter. It was discovered on 9 September 2015, by the Outer Solar System Origins Survey using the Canada–France–Hawaii Telescope at Mauna Kea Observatories, Hawaii, United States.

It is one a small number of detached objects with perihelion distances of 30 AUs or more, and semi-major axes of 200 AU or more. Such objects can not reach such orbits without some perturbing object, which lead to the speculation of planet nine.

References

External links 
 OSSOS survey by the Canada–France–Hawaii Telescope
 OSSOS VI. Striking Biases in the detection of large semimajor axis Trans-Neptunian Objects 16 Jun 2017
 2015 RY245 at the Minor Planet Center
 

Minor planet object articles (unnumbered)
20150909